Tiger (born February 12, 1987) is a Mexican Luchador enmascarado, or masked professional wrestler, working for the Mexico City based professional wrestling promotion Consejo Mundial de Lucha Libre (CMLL) under the name of Felino Jr.. He was previously known by the ring name Tiger Kid (sometimes spelled Tiger Kidd), but the name was shortened in June 2011. He frequently teams with his brother, luchador Puma. Tiger's real name is not a matter of public record, as is often the case with masked wrestlers in Mexico where their private lives are kept a secret from the wrestling fans. He is part of the Casas wrestling family, son of El Felino using a ring character and a mask very similar to his father and has been trained by his uncle, professional wrestler Negro Casas.

Professional wrestling career
Tiger Kid is part of the Casas wrestling family as he is the son of Jorge Luis Casas (El Felino) and the nephew of Negro Casas and Erick Casas. He made his debut In February 2006, wrestling as "Kid Tiger". Neither Tiger Kid, nor his younger brother Puma King, hid the fact that they were part of the Casas family, and with the use of the feline inspired names and mask that closely resembled the mask worn by El Felino it was speculated that they were the sons of El Felino. This was later denied by Tiger Kid, claiming that they chose their names and masks as a tribute to their favorite uncle. In an interview with SuperLuchas published in early June 2010 El Felino finally revealed that he was indeed the father of both Tiger Kid and Puma King, but had kept it a secret to allow his children to succeed or fail on their own merits and not because of their family relationship to El Felino.

Initially Tiger Kid worked for International Wrestling Revolution Group (IWRG) but began making appearances in Consejo Mundial de Lucha Libre (CMLL) by 2007, also training at their wrestling school in Guadalajara, Jalisco under CMLL trainers El Hijo del Gladiador, Franco Columbo, Satánico, Ringo Mendoza and Virus. In IWRG he competed in both the 2005 and 2007 Rey del Ring tournaments, but was too low in the rankings and too inexperienced to do more than just make up the numbers in the tournament. By mid 2007 he worked regularly for CMLL, using the name "Tiger Kid", considered to be one of the heirs to the "Casas Legacy"  In 2008 his brother Puma King began working for CMLL as well, which meant that the brothers often teamed up for low-card matches.

On April 7, 2009, Tiger Kid participated in a 10-man Torneo cibernetico for the vacant CMLL World Super Lightweight Championship. The other participants included Rey Cometa, Pegasso, Pólvora, Ángel Azteca, Jr., Inquisidor, Súper Comando, Ángel de Oro, Ángel de Plata and eventual winner Mascara Dorada. Tiger Kid teamed up with Mr. Niebla, a member of La Peste Negra along with his uncles Negro Casas and El Felino, to participate in the 2009 Gran Alternativa tournament. The Gran Alternativa tournament is an annual CMLL tournament that teams a veteran and a rookie (Novato) up for a tag team tournament. In the first round Tiger Kid and Mr. Niebla defeated Blue Panther and Rey Cometa but lost in the semi-final to Místico and Ángel de Oro. On October 18, 2009, Tiger Kid was one of 12 wrestlers who put his mask on the line in a 12-man Luchas de Apuestas cage match. He was the third person to escape the cage keeping his mask safe, the final saw Pólvora pin Tigre Blanco to unmask him.

In February, 2010 both Tiger Kid and Puma King became involved in El Felino's ongoing feud against La Sombra. It all began on February 2, 2010, where Puma King dressed up like his uncle El Felino to distract La Sombra during a match. A later doubleganger act backfired though and saw El Felino lose to La Sombra, which saw the end of the Tiger Kid/Puma King aid in the storyline. On April 23, 2010, Puma King participated in the 2010 Gran Alternativa, this time teaming with his uncle El Felino. The team lost to eventual Block A winners Delta and Volador Jr. in the first round. Tiger Kid was one of 12 men who put their mask on the line as part of a 12-man steel cage match in the main event of the 2010 Infierno en el Ring. During the match he pulled his own brother down off the cage, sacrificing him in order for Tiger Kid to escape the cage and keep his mask safe. In the end Ángel de Oro defeated Fabián el Gitano in the Lucha de Apueta (bet match) portion of the match to unmask him. In June 2011, Tiger Kid's ring name was shortened to just "Tiger". On November 30, Tiger was introduced as the new third member of Rey Bucanero's and El Terrible's rudo stable La Fuerza TRT, replacing El Texano, Jr., who had left CMLL a week earlier. In March 2013 Tiger was forced to team up with Delta to compete in the 2013 Torneo Nacional de Parejas Increibles ("National Incredible Pairs Tournament") where the concept was that rivals, or at least wrestlers on opposite sides of the rudo/tecnico divide would team up for a tag team tournament. Tiger and Delta had no previous rivalry and in fact wore matching colored outfits for the tournament as a sign of team unity. Despite their unity the team was eliminated by the team of Blue Panther and Rey Escorpión in the first round of the tournament. On August 11, Terrible and Bucanero kicked Tiger out of La Fuerza TRT and gave his spot over to Vangelis.

On December 25, 2015, as part of CMLL's annual Infierno en el Ring show Tiger was one of twelve men risking their mask in the main event steel cage match. He was the sixth man to leave the cage, keeping his mask safe in the process.

In December 2020, Tiger changed his ringname to Felino Jr.

Championships and accomplishments
Consejo Mundial de Lucha Libre
Torneo Parejas Increíbles Puebla (2019) – with Diamante Azul

Luchas de Apuestas record

Footnotes

References

1987 births
Living people
Masked wrestlers
Mexican male professional wrestlers
Professional wrestlers from Mexico City
Unidentified wrestlers
21st-century professional wrestlers
Mexican National Tag Team Champions